Genfo (gänəfo), Ga’at (ga'atə), or Marca (Oromiffa: Marqaa) is a stiff porridge-like substance that is normally formed into a round shape with a hole in the middle for the dipping sauce, a mixture of butter and red peppers, or pulses such as sunflower, seed, nut (Carthamus tinctorius) and flax (Linum usitatissimum).

Genfo shares many similarities with the Arab Asida. Genfo is made with barley or wheat flour and to cook it the flour and water are combined and stirred continuously with a wooden spoon. Genfo is presented in a large mound with a hole in the center, filled with a mixture of niter kibbeh and berbere. The porridge may be eaten with the hands or with a utensil.

See also

 Eritrean cuisine
List of African dishes
 List of Ethiopian dishes and foods
 List of porridges
Asida

References

Eritrean cuisine
Ethiopian cuisine
Porridges